Minimum safe altitude warning (MSAW) is an automated warning system for air traffic controllers (ATCO). It is a ground-based safety net intended to warn the controller about increased risk of controlled flight into terrain accidents by generating, in a timely manner, an alert of aircraft proximity to terrain or obstacles.

Description 

ICAO Doc 4444 requires that radar systems should provide for the display of safety-related alerts including the presentation of minimum safe altitude warning. It is worth mentioning that ICAO Doc 4444 does not provide a definition of the term MSAW. Instead the term MSAW is ambiguously used in ATC community to identify such warnings as well as for data processing systems providing the alert function.

References

External links 
 SKYbrary article on MSAW

Aviation safety
Air traffic control
Warning systems